James Brydges  may refer to:

James Brydges, 8th Baron Chandos (1642–1714), English Ambassador to the Ottoman Empire
James Brydges, 1st Duke of Chandos (1673–1744), English landowner and politician
James Brydges, 3rd Duke of Chandos (1731–1789), English peer and politician

See also
James Bridges (disambiguation)
Brydges (surname)